The Themed Entertainment Association (TEA) is an international non-profit association that represents creators, developers, designers and producers of themed entertainment.  It is also noted for its THEA Awards, which were founded in 1995 and are distributed annually in a range of themed entertainment categories.

Founding
The TEA was founded in 1991 by Monty Lunde, a former special effects designer for Disney who had gone on to start the special effects company Technifex with his business partner Rock Hall. The TEA mission, as stated in its bylaws, is to facilitate dialogue and communication among its members, to stimulate knowledge and professional growth, and to expand the size, diversity and awareness of the themed entertainment industry. Every year since 2007, the TEA has hosted a two-day TEA Summit, 2 days prior to the Thea Awards banquet, showcasing the teams that worked on these award winning projects.

Awards

The TEA presents the annual Thea Awards to projects that exemplify the highest standards of excellence and achievement, including individuals, parks, attractions, exhibits, and experiences in the themed entertainment industry. The Thea Awards began in 1994 with a single honoree: Harrison “Buzz” Price, the first recipient of the Thea Lifetime Achievement Award. That award is now called the Buzz Price Thea Award for a Lifetime of Outstanding Achievements in his honor. The second recipient was Marty Sklar in 1995. Bob Gurr was the recipient in 1999. In 1996, the Awards for Outstanding Achievement (AOA) were introduced, and ten were distributed. 
In the years since, additional special categories of AOA have been created, ensuring a multi-award event. Anyone can nominate a project, but judging is conducted by a committee that includes all past lifetime achievement honorees, one board liaison, and nine members-at-large appointed to three-year terms. Award recipients are announced in November and formally presented the following spring.

25th Annual Thea Award Recipients
In 2019, Theas were awarded to the following:

The Buzz Price Thea Award (recognizing a lifetime of distinguished achievements): Mark Woodbury, Vice Chairman of Universal Destinations & Experiences; President of Universal Creative
Classic Award: Dollywood, Pigeon Forge, Tennessee, U.S.
Attraction: Justice League: Battle for Metropolis, Six Flags Magic Mountain, Valencia, California, U.S.
Attraction: SlideWheel, Chimelong Water Park, Guangzhou, China
Attraction, Limited Budget: Bazyliszek, Legendia, Chorzow, Poland
Museum Experience, Limited Budget: Be Washington: It's Your Turn to Lead, George Washington's Mount Vernon, Mount Vernon, Virginia, U.S.
Connected Immersion, Digital Art: MORI Building DIGITAL ART MUSEUM: teamLab Borderless in Palette Town, Tokyo, Japan
Museum, Limited Budget: The Evel Knievel Museum, Topeka, Kansas, U.S.
Theme Park: Fantawild Oriental Heritage, Xiamen, China
Connected Immersion, Digital Overlay: ILLUMINATIONS: human/nature, Banff Centre for Arts and Creativity, Banff National Park, Alberta, Canada; and Rouge National Urban Park, Toronto, Canada
Brand Center: LEGO House A/S, Billund, Denmark
Repurposed Attraction: Nemo & Friends SeaRider, Tokyo DisneySea, Japan
Live Show: Legend of Camel Bells at the Huaxia Cultural Tourism Resort, Xi'an, China
Live Show Spectacular: Universal Spectacle Night Parade at Universal Studios Japan, Osaka
Water Theme Park: Volcano Bay, Universal Orlando Resort, Orlando, Florida
Outstanding Technical Innovation: Intel Shooting Star Drone System
Peter Chernack Distinguished Service Award: Michel Linet-Frion, Creative & Innovation Director at Pierre & Vacances Développement

24th Annual Thea Award Recipients
In 2018, Theas were awarded to the following:

The Buzz Price Thea Award (recognizing a lifetime of distinguished achievements): Phil Hettema, founder, The Hettema Group
Thea Classic Award: Cedar Point, Sandusky, Ohio, U.S.
Attraction: Symbolica: The Palace of Fantasy at de Efteling, The Netherlands
Attraction: Avatar Flight of Passage, Disney's Animal Kingdom, Orlando, Florida U.S.
Connected Immersion on a Limited Budget: Ghost Town Alive! at Knott's Berry Farm, Buena Park, California, U.S.
Theme park area development: Pandora – The World of Avatar, Disney's Animal Kingdom, Orlando, Florida U.S.
Museum Rehab, Limited Budget: Rainis' Museum Tadenava, Latvia
Museum exhibit on a limited budget: Gallipoli: The scale of our war at Museum of New Zealand Te Papa Tongarewa, Wellington, New Zealand
Heritage Visitor Center on a limited budget: Cittadella Visitors Centre, Gozo Island, Malta
Immersive Event: Les Carrières de Lumières, Les Baux de Provence, France
Immersive Event, limited budget: Aura, Notre-Dame Basilica of Montreal, Canada
Innovative Technology: 3D Live - "Holographic" 3D LED Display, with the first permanent installation at Mass Effect: New Earth at California's Great America, Santa Clara, California, U.S.
Brand Experience: Jameson Distillery Bow St., Dublin, Ireland
Connected Immersion: Sleep No More, Shanghai, China
Live Show: Chimelong Ocean Kingdom's Journey of Lights Parade, Chimelong Ocean Kingdom, Zhuhai, China
Attraction Reimagining: Frozen Ever After at Epcot, Orlando, Florida, U.S.
Attraction Reimagining: Guardians of the Galaxy – Mission: BREAKOUT! at Disney California Adventure, Disneyland Resort, U.S.
New Theme Park Land: DreamWorks Animation Zone at MOTIONGATE™ Dubai at Dubai Parks and Resorts, United Arab Emirates
Museum: National Museum of African American History and Culture, Washington DC, U.S.
Peter Chernack Distinguished Service Award: Joe Fox, PMP, Senior project engineer, Birket Engineering
Peter Chernack Distinguished Service Award: Annika Oetken

23rd Annual Thea Award Recipients
In 2017, Theas were awarded to the following:

The Buzz Price Thea Award (recognizing a lifetime of distinguished achievements): Jeremy Railton, Chairman & Founder of Entertainment Design Corporation 
Thea Classic Award: Waterworld: A Live Sea War Spectacular, Universal Studios Hollywood, U.S.
Attraction: Pirates of the Caribbean: Battle for the Sunken Treasure, Shanghai Disneyland, China 
Attraction: Camp Discovery, Shanghai Disneyland, China
Attraction: 5D Castle Theater, Chimelong Ocean Kingdom, Zhuhai, China 
Connected Immersion: Ghost Post at The Haunted Mansion, Disneyland Park, U.S.
Connected Immersion on a Limited Budget: Meow Wolf House of Eternal Return, Santa Fe, New Mexico U.S.
Eco-friendly Destination: Center Parcs Domaine du Bois aux Daims, Les Trois-Moutiers, France
Live Show: Le Dernier Panache at Puy du Fou, Les Epesses, France
Innovative Ride System: Mack Rides for the Inverted Powered Coaster
Immersive Museum Exhibit: Touring: Meet Vincent van Gogh Experience, Amsterdam, Netherlands
Technology: Slideboarding from WhiteWater West
Connected Immersion in Education: Senate Immersion Module at the Edward M. Kennedy Institute for the United States Senate, Boston, U.S.
Themed Food & Beverage Experience: Springfield, Universal Studios Hollywood, U.S.
Museum Exhibit on a Limited Budget: TRANSFORMATIONS, Museum of Latin American Art, Long Beach, California, U.S.
Peter Chernack Distinguished Service Award: Peter Chernack, The Chernack Group
Theme Park: Shanghai Disneyland, China

22nd Annual Thea Award Recipients
In 2016, Theas were awarded to the following:

The Buzz Price Thea Award (recognizing a lifetime of distinguished achievements): Keith James
Thea Classic Award: San Diego Zoo and San Diego Zoo Safari Park, U.S.
Attraction: One World Observatory, New York City, U.S.
Attraction: SpongeBob SubPants Adventure at Moody Gardens, Galveston, U.S.
Attraction on a Limited Budget: Les Amoureux de Verdun at Puy du Fou, Les Epesses, France
Interactive Attraction on a Limited Budget: Foresta Lumina, Parc de la Gorge de Coaticook, Coaticook, Quebec, Canada
Science/Discovery Garden: Rory Meyers Children's Adventure Garden, Dallas Arboretum and Botanical Garden, U.S.
Museum Exhibit: Alexander McQueen: Savage Beauty at Victoria and Albert Museum, London, UK
Science/Discovery Experience on a Limited Budget: Inspector Training Course, Discovery Cube Los Angeles, U.S.
Event Spectacular: Fountain of Dreams at Wuyishan, Fujian, China
Parade Spectacular:  Disney Paint the Night, Hong Kong Disneyland and Disneyland (Anaheim), U.S.
Technology on a Limited Budget: Gantom Torch Technology
Technology Breakthrough: Geppetto Animation Control System
Brand Experience on a Limited Budget: Manufacturing Innovation Ford Rouge Factory Tour, The Henry Ford, Dearborn, U.S.
Corporate Visitor Center Rehab on a Limited Budget: Moments of Happiness at World of Coca-Cola, Atlanta, U.S.
Environmental Media Experience: Integrated Environmental Media System at LAX Los Angeles International Airport, U.S.
TEA Distinguished Service Honoree:  John Robinett

21st Annual Thea Award Recipients
In 2015, Theas were awarded to the following:

The Buzz Price Thea Award (recognizing a lifetime of distinguished achievements): Ron Miziker
Thea Classic Award: It's a Small World at Disneyland, Anaheim, U.S.
Thea Paragon Award: The Wizarding World of Harry Potter: Diagon Alley at Universal Studios Florida, Orlando, U.S.
Attraction: Harry Potter and the Escape from Gringotts, Universal Studios Florida, Orlando, U.S.
Technical Excellence: Interactive Wands at The Wizarding World of Harry Potter, Universal Studios Florida, Orlando, U.S.
New Theme Park Land: Graatassland ("The Land of the Little Grey Tractor") at Kongeparken, Ålgård, Norway
Live Show on a Limited Budget: The Grand Hall Experience at Union Station, St. Louis, U.S.
Interactive Park Attraction on a Limited Budget: Wilderness Explorers at Disney's Animal Kingdom, Walt Disney World, Orlando, U.S.
Museum Exhibit on a Limited Budget: Nature Lab, Natural History Museum of Los Angeles County, Los Angeles, U.S.
Event Spectacular: Wings of Time at Sentosa Island, Singapore
Corporate Brand-Land: The StoryGarden at The Amorepacific Beauty Campus, Gyeonggi-do, South Korea
Themed Restaurant: Bistrot Chez Remy at Walt Disney Studios Park, Disneyland Paris, France
Theme Park: Chimelong Ocean Kingdom, Hengqin, Zhuhai, China
Extraordinary Cultural Achievement: National September 11 Memorial Museum, New York City, U.S.
Museum: Wonderkamers at Gemeentemuseum Den Haag, The Hague, Netherlands
Attraction: The Time Machine at Parc du Futuroscope, Poiters, France
TEA Distinguished Service Honoree:  Pat MacKay

20th Annual Thea Award Recipients
In 2014, Theas were awarded to the following:

The Buzz Price Thea Award (recognizing a lifetime of distinguished achievements): Garner Holt
Thea Classic Award: The Enchanted Tiki Room at Disneyland, Anaheim, U.S.
Breakthrough Technology: Revolution Tru-Trackless Ride System by Oceaneering Entertainment Systems
Botanical Garden: Gardens by the Bay, Singapore
Event Spectacular: Michael Jackson: One at Mandalay Bay Hotel, Las Vegas, U.S.
Participatory Character Greeting: Enchanted Tales with Belle at Walt Disney World's Magic Kingdom, Orlando, U.S.
Science Museum: The Mind Museum, Taguig City, Philippines
Unique Art Installation: Marine Worlds Carousel at Les Machines de l’ïle, Nantes, France 
Attraction Revitalization: Polynesian Cultural Center, Oahu, Hawaii
4D Simulator on a Limited Budget: De Vuurproef, Het Spoorwegmuseum, Utrecht, Netherlands 
Attraction: Mystic Manor at Hong Kong Disneyland, Hong Kong
Visitor Center: Titanic Belfast, Northern Ireland
Live Show on a Limited Budget: The Song of an Angel at Universal Studios Japan, Osaka, Japan
TEA Distinguished Service Honoree:  Karen McGee

19th Annual Thea Award Recipients
In 2013, Theas were awarded to the following:

The Buzz Price Thea Award (recognizing a lifetime of distinguished achievements): Frank Stanek
Thea Classic Award: Europa-Park, Rust, Germany
Event Spectacular: The Big-O show at Yeosu 2012 International Expo, South Korea
Attraction: Radiator Springs Racers at Disney California Adventure, Anaheim, U.S.
Attraction: Transformers: The Ride 3D at Universal Studios Singapore and Universal Studios Hollywood
New Theme Park Land: Cars Land at Disney California Adventure, Anaheim, U.S.
Museum: Canada's Sports Hall of Fame, Calgary, Canada
Event Spectacular: Aquanura at Efteling Park, Kaatsheuvel, Netherlands
Breakthrough Technology: Tait Pixel Tablets
Studio Tour: Warner Bros. Studio Tour London: The Making of Harry Potter, Leavesden, England
Themed Resort Hotel: Aulani, a Disney Resort and Spa, Ko Olina Resort, Oahu, Hawaii
Themed Restaurant: Carthay Circle Restaurant and Lounge at Disney California Adventure, Anaheim, U.S.
TEA Distinguished Service Honoree: Judith Rubin

18th Annual Thea Award Recipients
In 2012, Theas were awarded to the following:

The Buzz Price Thea Award (formerly the Lifetime Achievement Award): Joe Rohde, Walt Disney Imagineering
Thea Classic Award: Puy du Fou: Le Grand Parc and Cinéscénie, Vendée, France
Attraction: Space Fantasy: The Ride at Universal Studios Japan, Osaka, Japan
Attraction on a Limited Budget: Barnas Brannstasjon (Children's Fire Station) at Kongeparken, Ålgård, Norway
Attraction: Arthur l'Aventure 4D at Futuroscope, Poitiers, France
Attraction Refresh: Star Tours: The Adventures Continue at Disneyland and Disney's Hollywood Studios at Walt Disney World, U.S.
Museum Exhibit: NatureQuest at Fernbank Museum of Natural History, Atlanta, U.S.
Museum Exhibit: YOU! The Experience at Museum of Science and Industry, Chicago, U.S.
Science Center Attraction on a Limited Budget: The Changing Climate Show at Science North, Greater Sudbury, Canada
Cultural Heritage Attraction on a Limited Budget: Ghost of the Castle at Louisiana's Old State Capitol, Baton Rouge, U.S.
Show Spectacular: Crane Dance at Resorts World Sentosa, Singapore
Show Spectacular: The Magic, The Memories and You at Walt Disney World’s Magic Kingdom, U.S.
Live Show Event Spectacular: Yo México, Celebration of the Century of the Mexican Revolution, Mexico City, Mexico
Live Show Spectacular: The House of Dancing Water at City of Dreams, Macau
Themed Restaurant Experience: FoodLoop at Europa-Park, Rust, Germany
Ingenious Use of Technology: Animation Magic in the Animator’s Palate Restaurant aboard Disney Cruise Line’s ship Disney Fantasy

17th Annual Thea Award Recipients
In 2011, Theas were awarded to the following:

The Buzz Price Thea Award (formerly the Lifetime Achievement Award): Kim Irvine, Art Director, Disneyland 
Thea Classic Award: The Exploratorium, San Francisco, U.S.
Expo Pavilion Exhibit: Along the River During the Qingming Festival, China Pavilion, Shanghai Expo 2010, China
Museum: The National Infantry Museum, Columbus, Georgia, U.S.
Museum: The Walt Disney Family Museum, San Francisco, U.S.
Museum/Science Center Exhibit: Science Storms, Museum of Science & Industry, Chicago, U.S.
Museum Attraction: Beyond All Boundaries, Solomon Victory Theater, National World War II Museum, New Orleans, U.S.
Museum: Glasnevin Museum, Dublin, Ireland
Nighttime Spectacular: World of Color, Disney California Adventure, Anaheim, U.S.
Integration of Technology and Storytelling: ICT Mobile Device, Information and Communications Pavilion, Shanghai Expo 2010, China
Promotional Event: "Flynn Lives", San Diego Comic-Con 2010, San Diego, U.S.
New Theme Park Land: The Wizarding World of Harry Potter, Universal Orlando Resort, Orlando, U.S.
Thematic Integration of Retail, Food & Beverage Experiences: The Wizarding World of Harry Potter, Universal Orlando Resort, Orlando, U.S.
Feature Attraction: Harry Potter and the Forbidden Journey, Universal Orlando Resort, Orlando, U.S.
Technical Achievement: Harry Potter and the Forbidden Journey, Universal Orlando Resort, Orlando, U.S.

16th Annual Thea Award Recipients
In 2010, Theas were awarded to the following:

Lifetime Achievement Award:  Mark Fuller, WET Design
Thea Classic Award:  Coal Mine, Chicago Museum of Science and Industry, Chicago, U.S.
Attraction: Toy Story Midway Mania, Disney's California Adventure and Hollywood Studios at Walt Disney World
Attraction: The Dragon’s Treasure, City of Dreams, Macau
Attraction Rehab: Disaster!, Universal Studios Florida, Orlando, U.S.
Museum: The Museum at Bethel Woods, New York, U.S.
Museum: Please Touch Museum, Philadelphia, U.S.
Traveling Exhibition: America I Am: The African American Imprint
Science Center Exhibit: Skyscraper! Achievement & Impact, Liberty Science Center, Liberty State Park, Jersey City, U.S.
Zoo Attraction on a Limited Budget: McNeil Avian Center, Philadelphia Zoo, U.S.
Live Show: Tea Show at Overseas Chinese Town East Resort, Shenzhen, China
Brand Experience: Heineken Experience, Amsterdam, Netherlands

15th Annual Thea Award Recipients
In 2009, Theas were awarded to the following:

Lifetime Achievement Award:  Robert L. Ward
Thea Classic Award:  EPCOT
Museum: National Museum of the Marine Corps
Museum:  The Newseum
Museum Exhibit:  Operation Spy at the International Spy Museum
Museum Exhibit, Limited Budget:  Force of Nature at Arizona Science Center
Learning Experience:  Air Force One Discovery Center at the Ronald Reagan Presidential Library
Science Center  Audubon Insectarium
Live Show:  Finding Nemo - The Musical
Live Show:  The Legend of Mythica at Tokyo DisneySea
Event Spectacular:  2008 Summer Olympics opening ceremony
Casino Attraction:  Wynn Macau's Tree of Prosperity
Technical:  Muppet Mobile Lab at Hong Kong Disneyland
New Theme Park Land:  Jungala at Busch Gardens Tampa Bay
Attraction, Limited Budget:  Bewilderwood
Attraction, Limited Budget:  The Forgotten Mine at Park Molenheide in Houthalen-Helchteren, Belgium
Attraction:  The Simpsons Ride at Universal Studios Florida and Universal Studios Hollywood

14th Annual Thea Award Recipients
In 2008, Thea Awards for Outstanding Achievement were awarded to the following:

Attraction: Shuttle Launch Experience, Kennedy Space Center
Attraction, Limited Budget:  Awakening of the Temple, Aztec On The River
Attraction Rehab:  Finding Nemo Submarine Voyage, Disneyland
Themed Training Experience:  Battle Stations 21, U.S. Navy
Interactive Adventure:  Kim Possible World Showcase Adventure, Walt Disney World
Technical Achievement:  Kà by Cirque du Soleil
Science Center, Limited Budget:  Cosmos at the Castle, Blackrock Castle Observatory
Exhibit, Limited Budget:  Cleveland Avenue Time Machine, Troy University's Rosa Parks Library and Museum
Traveling Exhibit, Limited Budget:  CSI: The Experience
Exhibit:  Noah's Ark at the Skirball, Los Angeles
Museum:  Discovering the Real George Washington, Mount Vernon
Heritage Center:  Chain of Generations Center, JerU.S.lem
Event Spectacular:  Songs of the Sea, Sentosa
Traveling Exhibit, Limited Budget:  Walking with Dinosaurs: The Live Experience
Event Spectacular:  Peter Pan's Neverland, Universal Studios Japan
Thea Classic Award:  SeaWorld San Diego

13th Annual Thea Award Recipients
In 2007, Theas were awarded to the following:

Lifetime Achievement Award:  Bob Rogers
Thea Classic Award:  Madame Tussauds London
Museum Touring Attraction:  Ashes and Snow
Live Show:  Believe at SeaWorld
Brand Retail Experience:  Boudin at the Wharf
Attraction:  Expedition Everest
Aquarium:  The Georgia Aquarium
Simulated Experience:  The Great Glass Elevator at Alton Towers
Children's Museum:  Kidspace Children's Museum
Live Event:  "Move, Live" - Toyota Pavilion at Expo 2005
Aquarium Exhibit/Limited Budget:  The Real-Cost Cafe at Monterey Bay Aquarium
Museum Touring Exhibition:  Robots: The Interactive Exhibition
Attraction:  Ski Dubai
Museum Exhibit:  U-505 Submarine Exhibit at Chicago's Museum of Science and Industry
Zoo Exhibit:  Zoomazium at Woodland Park Zoo

12th Annual Thea Award Recipients
In 2006, Theas were awarded to the following:

The Buzz Price Thea Award (recognizing a lifetime of distinguished achievements): Yves Pépin
Thea Classic: Disneyland
Awards for Outstanding Achievement
Olympic Spirit Toronto, Canada
Images of Singapore at Sentosa Island
Athens 2004 Olympics Opening Ceremony, Greece
Abraham Lincoln Presidential Library and Museum
The Churchill Lifeline Table, London, United Kingdom
Remember... Dreams Come True, Disneyland
Fear Factor Live, Universal Studios Hollywood
Curse of DarKastle: The Ride
Dodge Wild Earth at the Philadelphia Zoo (Limited Budget)
Ice Age Adventure! Bremen, Germany (Limited Budget)
MagiQuest Technology (Technology)

11th Annual Thea Award Recipients
In 2005, Theas were awarded to the following:

The Buzz Price Thea Award (recognizing a lifetime of distinguished achievements): Barry Upson
Thea Classic: Efteling, Kaatsheuvel, The Netherlands
Awards for Outstanding Achievement
Revenge of the Mummy, Universal Orlando
The Challenge of Tutankhamon, Walibi, Wavre, Belgium
Mission: SPACE, Epcot, Orlando
Disney's Aladdin: A Musical Spectacular, Disney California Adventure, Anaheim
Freedom Rising, National Constitution Center, Philadelphia
The Spy Museum, Washington DC
The Ford Rouge Factory Tour, Dearborn, Michigan
uShaka Marine World, Durban, South Africa
Jurassic Park Institute Tour, Japan
Greenfield Village, The Henry Ford, Dearborn, Michigan
The Imagination Workshop, Temecula, CA (Limited Budget)
Action! An Adventure in Moviemaking, Museum of Science and Industry, Chicago (Limited Budget)
Health Royale, The Avampato Discovery Center, West Virginia (Limited Budget)
Lucky the Dinosaur, Walt Disney Imagineering Research & Development (Technology)

10th Annual Thea Award Recipients
In 2003 (awards moved from fall to spring, skipping 2004), Theas were awarded to the following:

The Buzz Price Thea Award (recognizing a lifetime of distinguished achievements): George Millay
Thea Classic: Knott's Scary Farm Halloween Haunt, Knott's Berry Farm, Buena Park, California
Awards for Outstanding Achievement
Cine’Magique, Walt Disney Studios, Disneyland Paris
Templo del Fuego, PortAventura World, Spain
Tomb Raider: The Ride, Paramount's Kings Island, Cincinnati
Haunted Mansion Holiday, Disneyland
2002 Winter Olympics Opening Ceremonies, Salt Lake City
Cerritos Library, Cerritos, California
Luz y Voces del Tajin, Mexico
The Grove, Los Angeles
Die Glaserne Manufaktur, Dresden, Germany
The Guinness Storehouse, Dublin, Ireland
Legoland Parks (Special Achievement)
Stitch’s Photo Phone, Walt Disney Imagineering (Technology)
The Great Barn, Stone Mountain, Georgia (Limited Budget)

9th Annual Thea Award Recipients
In 2002, Theas were awarded to the following:

The Buzz Price Thea Award (recognizing a lifetime of distinguished achievements): Jon Jerde
Thea Classic: Universal Studio's Tram Tour
Awards for Outstanding Achievement
The Sherman Brothers (Special Achievement)
Les Mysteres de la Mer, France
The London Eye, United Kingdom
Animal Celebration, Universal Studios Japan
Disney Animation, Disney's California Adventure
Soarin' Over California, Disney's California Adventure
FDNY Fire Zone, New York (Limited Budget)
Star of Destiny Theater, Texas State History Museum
Ireland at Busch Gardens Williamsburg, Virginia
Disney's Animal Kingdom Lodge, Orlando, Florida
Tokyo DisneySea & Entertainment Program
Chicano Now: American Expressions
Schlitterbahn Beach Waterpark, Texas
Texas Wild!, Fort Worth Zoo, Texas
Media Pro 4000 (Technology)

8th Annual Thea Award Recipients
In 2001, Theas were awarded to the following:

The Buzz Price Thea Award (recognizing a lifetime of distinguished achievements): Tony Baxter
Thea Classic: Silver Dollar City
Awards for Outstanding Achievement
Millennium Village Event
Pirates of the Caribbean: Battle of the Buccaneer Gold
Sydney 2000 Olympics: Opening Ceremony
The Great Platte River Road Archway Monument
Nickelodeon Flying Super Saturator
Men in Black: Alien Attack, Universal Studios Florida
Discovery Cove, Tokyo DisneySea
Lights of Liberty Show
HollandRama, Holland
Kid's City/La Ciudad de los Ninos
Desert Passage
Volkswagen Autostadt, Germany
Exploration in the New Millenium (Limited Budget)
L'Oxygenarium, France (Limited Budget)
Stealth – World’s First Flying Coaster (Innovation)
Disney's FASTPASS (Innovation)

7th Annual Thea Award Recipients
In 2000, Theas were awarded to the following:

Thea Classic: Tivoli Gardens
Awards for Outstanding Achievement
The Stone Forest
The Palmach Museum, Israel
"The Year 2000 Starting Signal" Millennium Pyro Ballet
Richmond Sound Design Ltd.'s AudioBox (Technology)
James Cameron’s Titanic: The Experience
COSI Columbus
FiestAventura at PortAventura, Spain
Test Track at Epcot
Gold's Gym presents HEROES – Health, Fitness and Beyond
Animator's Palate, Disney Cruise Line
Atlantis, Paradise Island
The Amazing Adventures of Spider-Man at Universal Orlando
Trial by Fire (Limited Budget)

6th Annual Thea Award Recipients
In 1999, Theas were awarded to the following:
The Buzz Price Thea Award (recognizing a lifetime of distinguished achievements): Bob Gurr
Thea Classic: The Haunted Mansion, Disneyland
Awards for Outstanding Achievement
"It’s Tough to be a Bug, Animal Kingdom
Journey to Atlantis, Sea World Orlando
Animal Kingdom
Disney Quest, Orlando
American Girl Place, Chicago
Acquamatrix Show at the Lisbon World Expo ’98
Café Odyssey, Mall of America
"O", Cirque du Soleil, Las Vegas
Viejas Outlet Center & Legend of Nightfire Fountain Show
DVP Server Pro (Technical)
Titanic Official Movie Tour
Robot Zoo, Toronto, Canada
M&M’s Academy, Las Vegas (Limited Budget)
Hotel Gasten, Liseberg, Sweden (Limited Budget)

5th Annual Thea Award Recipients
In 1998, Theas were awarded to the following:
The Buzz Price Thea Award (recognizing a lifetime of distinguished achievements): John Hench
Thea Classic: Calico Mountain, Knotts Berry Farm
Awards for Outstanding Achievement
Ripley's Aquarium, Myrtle Beach, South Carolina
Star Trek: The Experience, Las Vegas
Space Quest Casino, Las Vegas
New York-New York Hotel and Casino, Las Vegas
The Power of Houston
Coney Island Emporium in the New York-New York Hotel
Masquerade Show in the Sky, Rio Suite Hotel and Casino, Las Vegas
Royal Armouries Museum, Leeds, United Kingdom
Adventure Slots (Limited Budget)
Encounter at LAX, Los Angeles International Airport (Limited Budget)
UFO Encounters (Limited Budget)

4th Annual Thea Award Recipients
In 1997, Theas were awarded to the following:
The Buzz Price Thea Award (recognizing a lifetime of distinguished achievements): Don Iwerks
Thea Classic: Pirates of the Caribbean, Disneyland
Awards for Outstanding Achievement
Terminator 2:3D, The Battle Across Time, Universal Studios Florida
Villa Volta, Efteling, Holland
Daytona U.S., Daytona Speedway, Florida
Apollo/Saturn V Center, Kennedy Space Center, Florida
Warner Bros. Studio Store Expansion, NYC
Niketown New York, NYC
Caesars Magical Empire, Caesars Palace, Las Vegas
The Intergalactic Circus Spectacular, Lotte World, Seoul, Korea
Rock'n Robin, Cinema World, Kamakura City, Japan (Limited Budget)
Dark Castle, Fantasy Pointe, Nasu Highlands, Japan (Limited Budget)

3rd Annual Thea Award Recipients
In 1996, Theas were awarded to the following:
Outstanding Individual Achievement: Monty Lunde
Thea Classic: Pirates of the Caribbean, Disneyland
Awards for Outstanding Achievement
Ocean Base Atlantic, New Jersey State Aquarium
Wild Arctic, Sea World Florida
Waterworld, A Live Sea War Spectacular, Universal Studios Hollywood
Fremont Street Experience, Las Vegas
Rainforest Café, Schaumburg, Illinois
Honey, I Shrunk the Audience, Epcot
Indiana Jones Adventure, Disneyland
Mystery Lodge, Knott’s Berry Farm
Space Mountain, From the Earth to the Moon, Disneyland Paris

2nd Annual Thea Award Recipients
In 1995, Theas were awarded to the following:
The Buzz Price Thea Award (recognizing a lifetime of distinguished achievements): Marty Sklar

1st Annual Thea Award Recipients
In 1995, Theas were awarded to the following:
Lifetime Achievement Award: Harrison "Buzz" Price

See also
International Association of Amusement Parks and Attractions
Theme park

References

External links
 

Organizations established in 1991
1991 establishments in California
Amusement parks
Lifetime achievement awards
Trade associations based in the United States
Entertainment industry associations
Awards established in 1995
Annual events in California
Non-profit organizations based in California